Governor Howard may refer to:

Benjamin Howard (Missouri politician) (1760–1814), 1st Governor of Missouri Territory
Carlos Howard (1738–?), Governor of West Florida from 1792 to 1793
Francis Howard, 5th Baron Howard of Effingham (1643–1690s), Crown Governor of Virginia from 1683 to 1692
George Howard (Governor of Maryland) (1789–1846), 22nd Governor of Maryland
Henry Anthony Camillo Howard (1913–1977), Governor of the British Virgin Islands from 1954 to 1956
Henry Howard (Rhode Island politician) (1826–1905), 32nd Governor of Rhode Island
John Eager Howard (1752–1827), 5th Governor of Maryland
William Alanson Howard (1813–1880), 6th Governor of the Dakota Territory